Immersion: Three is a 3-disc album by the American ambient musician Steve Roach, released in 2007.  It is the third album in the Immersion series.

Overview
Immersion: Three is a set of three long-form pieces, each released on its own disc, created for purposes where "traditional music could be considered invasive." The compositions stemmed from Steve Roach's contemplation of hypnagogia and self-exploration.

The album is released in an eight-panel Digipak book.  The Immersion series was continued with Immersion: Four (2009) and Immersion Five: Circadian Rhythms (2011).

Reception

Track listing

Personnel
Steve Roach (synthesizers)

References

External links
 Immersion : Three at Projekt Records

2007 albums
Steve Roach (musician) albums
Projekt Records albums